Jurband (also Romanized as Jūrband; also known as Jorband) is a village in Natel-e Restaq Rural District, Chamestan District, Nur County, Mazandaran Province, Iran. At the 2006 census, its population was 1,870, in 537 families.

References 

Populated places in Nur County